This is a list of properties and districts listed on the National Register of Historic Places in the central area of Washington, D.C.  For the purposes of this list central Washington, D. C. is defined as all of the Northwest quadrant east of Rock Creek and south of M Street and all of the Southwest quadrant.  This includes the National Mall, Downtown, the Penn Quarter, the Monumental Core and most of the popular tourist sites in Washington.

Current listings

|}

See also 
List of National Historic Landmarks in Washington, D.C.
National Register of Historic Places listings in Washington, D.C.

References 

Central